"I Wonder What They’re Doing Tonight (Your Girl and Mine)" is a 1918 song by composer John C. Egan and lyricists Lew Brown and Al Harriman. It was published by the Broadway Music Corp. A version of the song was recorded by Arthur Fields.

References 

1918 songs
Songs of World War I
Songs with lyrics by Lew Brown